A Gentleman of Leisure is a novel by P. G. Wodehouse.

A Gentleman of Leisure may also refer to:

 A Gentleman of Leisure (1915 film), a film directed by George Melford
 A Gentleman of Leisure (1923 film), a film directed by Joseph Henabery